The 1993 Masters Tournament was the 57th Masters Tournament, held April 8–11 at Augusta National Golf Club. Bernhard Langer won his second Masters championship, four strokes ahead of runner-up Chip Beck.

Heavy rains on Friday afternoon caused a delay and the second round was not completed until Saturday morning. Jeff Maggert was the leader in the clubhouse at 137 (−7) while Langer was at six-under after sixteen holes when darkness suspended play. Langer, the 1985 champion, finished that round with pars and then forged a four-shot lead with a 69 in the third round to equal the best round of the day. Tied for second were Beck and Dan Forsman.

On Sunday, Forsman got within one shot of Langer, but found the water twice at the par-3 12th and the quadruple bogey ended his chances. Langer was even par for the round through twelve holes, then eagled the par-5 13th. Playing in the final pairing with Langer, Beck trailed by three shots at the par-5 15th, chose to lay up, missed the green, and scrambled for par. Langer made birdie for a comfortable lead, which extended to five strokes after Beck bogeyed 16.

None of the five amateurs made the cut; Justin Leonard was the closest at 149 (+5), two strokes shy.

Course

Field
1. Masters champions
Tommy Aaron, Seve Ballesteros (3), Gay Brewer, Billy Casper, Charles Coody, Fred Couples (12,13), Ben Crenshaw (12), Nick Faldo (3,9,10,11), Raymond Floyd (9,13), Doug Ford, Bernhard Langer, Sandy Lyle, Larry Mize (9,12), Jack Nicklaus, Arnold Palmer, Gary Player, Craig Stadler (12,13), Tom Watson, Ian Woosnam (9,10), Fuzzy Zoeller (9)

George Archer, Jack Burke Jr., Bob Goalby, Ben Hogan, Herman Keiser, Cary Middlecoff, Byron Nelson, Henry Picard, Gene Sarazen, Sam Snead, and Art Wall Jr. did not play.

2. U.S. Open champions (last five years)
Hale Irwin, Tom Kite (12,13), Payne Stewart (4), Curtis Strange

3. The Open champions (last five years)
Mark Calcavecchia, Ian Baker-Finch (9,10)

4. PGA champions (last five years)
John Daly (9,12), Wayne Grady (9), Nick Price (9,10,12,13), Jeff Sluman (9,10,13)

5. U.S. Amateur champion and runner-up
Justin Leonard (a)

Tom Scherrer forfeited his exemption by turning professional

6. The Amateur champion
Stephen Dundas (a)

7. U.S. Amateur Public Links champion
Warren Schutte (a)

8. U.S. Mid-Amateur champion
Danny Yates (a)

9. Top 24 players and ties from the 1992 Masters
Billy Ray Brown (12,13), Nolan Henke, Mike Hulbert (10), Bruce Lietzke (12,13), Andrew Magee, Greg Norman (12,13), Mark O'Meara (13), Craig Parry, Steve Pate (13), Corey Pavin (13), Dillard Pruitt, Ted Schulz, Scott Simpson

10. Top 16 players and ties from the 1992 U.S. Open
Billy Andrade, Jay Don Blake, John Cook (11,12,13), Bob Gilder, Tom Lehman (13), Mark McCumber, Colin Montgomerie, Gil Morgan, Joey Sindelar

11. Top eight players and ties from 1992 PGA Championship
Russ Cochran, Dan Forsman (12,13), Jim Gallagher Jr. (13), Jeff Maggert, Gene Sauers

12. Winners of PGA Tour events since the previous Masters
Paul Azinger (13), Mark Carnevale, David Edwards (13), Brad Faxon (13), David Frost (13), Fred Funk, Bill Glasson, Jay Haas (13), Gary Hallberg, John Huston (13), Lee Janzen (13), Davis Love III (13), Phil Mickelson, Brett Ogle, David Peoples (13), Mike Standly, Howard Twitty, Lanny Wadkins, Richard Zokol

13. Top 30 players from the 1992 PGA Tour money list
Chip Beck, Mark Brooks, Keith Clearwater, Steve Elkington, Duffy Waldorf

14. Special foreign invitation
Anders Forsbrand, Tony Johnstone, José María Olazábal, Masashi Ozaki, Naomichi Ozaki

Round summaries

First round
Thursday, April 8, 1993

Second round
Friday, April 9, 1993
Saturday, April 10, 1993

Amateurs: Leonard (+5), Schutte (+8), Yates (+11), Dundas (+17)

Third round
Saturday, April 10, 1993

Source:

Final round
Sunday, April 11, 1993

Final leaderboard

Sources:

Scorecard

Cumulative tournament scores, relative to par

References

External links
Masters.com – Past winners and results
Augusta.com – 1993 Masters leaderboard and scorecards

1993
1993 in golf
1993 in American sports
1993 in sports in Georgia (U.S. state)
April 1993 sports events in the United States